The Oklahoma City Yard Dawgz were an arena football team. The team began play as a 2004 expansion team of the Arena Football League's minor league af2 before becoming a member of the AFL in 2010. Formerly a tenant of the Ford Center from 2004 until 2008, the Yard Dawgz were forced out when the National Basketball Association's Oklahoma City Thunder moved into town; starting in 2009, the Yard Dawgz played across the street at the Cox Convention Center. On October 25, 2010 Yard Dawgz owner Phil Miller announced that he decided not to play in the Arena Football League for the 2011 season.

Team history

Three straight winning seasons

The Yard Dawgz had a successful first year on and off the field by leading the league in attendance and finishing the regular season with 10–6 record to finish second in the Southwest Division of the National Conference.

In 2005, The Yard Dawgz had another successful year, despite changing divisions, by coming in third in attendance and finishing the regular season with 10–6 record to finish second in the Midwest Division of the National Conference. The Dawgz lost in the first round to the Amarillo Dusters.

The Yard Dawgz had their best showing in 2006 with a record of 11–5 and their third playoff appearance. Kicker A.J. Haglund won the af2 Kicker of the Year award and Quarterback Craig Strickland became the only player in af2 history to reach 20,000 career passing yards.

First losing season
In 2007, under head coach John Fitzgerald, the Yard Dawgz had the second leading offense in the league – averaging 310.9 yd/game. Despite finishing 7-9, the team made its fourth consecutive playoff appearance. Three members of the 2007 Yard Dawgz earned All-af2 First Team honors – WR/DB Al Hunt, Center Gene Frederic, and OL/DL Barry Giles.

2008 season
The Yard Dawgs brought back Gary Reasons to coach in 2008, but after the team got off to a 1–5 start, Reasons stepped down as head coach. Sparky McEwen took over as interim head coach. On June 28, 2008 against the Lubbock Renegades, Wide Receiver Al Hunt became only the third player in af2 history to record 1,000 points.

2009 season
After starting the season with a team-record 4–0 record, the Yard Dawgz dropped five games in a row, the longest in team history, to drop to 4–5.  Since then, the Dawgz won three straight to push their record to 7–5 with an eye still on the playoffs.

On June 20, the Yard Dawgz faced off against the Corpus Christi Sharks.  The Yard Dawgz beat the Sharks 93–41 and set an af2 record for points scored in the first half (59) and beat the franchise record of points scored in a game that was originally set against the Tulsa Talons.

Despite a win to the Spokane Shock on June 26, the Yard Dawgz clinched a playoff berth after a loss by Central Valley to Boise the next night. The playoff appearance marked the ninth time in six years the Dawgz were in post-season play.

The Yard Dawgz season ended on August 1 at the hands of the Tulsa Turkeys in the first round of ArenaCup playoffs.  With the loss, the Dawgz has dropped five straight postseason games and is winless in the team's history in the playoffs.

2011 season

On October 25, 2010, Yard Dawgz owner Phil Miller announced that he decided not to play in the Arena Football League for the 2011 season. However, the Indoor Football League announced the same day that a new team would play in Oklahoma City in 2011.

Season-by-season

Final roster

Staff

Head coaches

References

External links
 Official Site
 Oklahoma City Yard Dawgz on ArenaFan

 
2004 establishments in Oklahoma
2010 disestablishments in Oklahoma